Fernando Gaitán Salom (9 November 1960 – 29 January 2019) was a Colombian TV series and telenovela screenwriter as well as a producer.

Career
Fernando Gaitán was known for weaving different histories into diverse social contexts. He gained fame in Latin America after writing the telenovela Café, con aroma de mujer and world notoriety for his telenovela Yo soy Betty, la fea which has been adapted in different countries. Yo soy Betty, la fea won the TP de Oro for its nominated category, Mejor Telenovela (Best Soap Opera) in 2002. The TP de Oro awards are considered to be the most prestigious Spanish awards for television.

The success of Yo soy Betty, la fea led to a sequel in 2002 with Univision's release of Eco moda. Yo soy Betty, la fea also spawned a number of international remakes and adaptations, such as Verliebt in Berlin in Germany, La Fea más bella in Mexico, Lotte in The Netherlands, Ne Rodis Krasivoy in Russia, Jassi Jaissi Koi Nahin in India, Sensiz Olmuyor in Turkey, Maria, i Aschimi in Greece, Yo soy Bea in Spain, Ugly Betty in the United States, and Bela, a Feia in Brazil.

Gaitán received multiple awards and nominations in Colombia and internationally; India Catalina Award (1993, 1994, 2000, 2001), Simón Bolívar Award (1994), El Tiempo Award (1999, 2000), Radio Caracas Televisión Award (2000), Asociación Cronistas del Espectáculo in the United States (1995), GES Awards and INTE Awards in Miami (2002).

An article in Variety reported that the success of Yo soy Betty, la fea spin-offs has led to the search for other telenovelas being planned for the United States.

His Cafe con Aroma de Mujer (Coffee With the Scent of a Woman), a hit for Colombia's RCN TV in 1994, was remade in Mexico twice. The first version was TV Azteca's Cuando seas mia in 2001.  As of 2007 Televisa was airing its own Cafe con Aroma de Mujer, with the title Destilando Amor.

TV filmography

Writer
 Destilando Amor (2007) TV Series
 Lotte (2006) TV Series
 Yo soy Betty, la fea (1999 - 2001) (I am Betty, the ugly)
 La Hija del Mariachi (2006) (The Mariachi's Daughter) TV Series
 Hasta que la plata nos separe (2006) (Until Money do Us Apart) TV Series
 Eco Moda (2001) TV Series
 Cuando seas mía (2001) (When You are Mine) TV series
 Maria, i Aschimi (2007) (Maria, the ugly one) TV series
 Guajira (1996) TV Series (Guajira) Telenovela
 Café, con aroma de mujer (1994) Telenovela
 Azúcar - Part II (Sugar) Telenovela
 Laura por favor (Laura, Please) TV Series
 La quinta hoja del trébol (The Fifth Leaf of Clover)
 La fuerza del poder (The Force of Power)
 Hasta que el dinero nos separe (Until money do us part)
 A corazón abierto (Open-Heart)

Executive producer
 Ugly Betty (2006) ("The Lyin', the Watch and the Wardrobe") TV Episode

Personal life
Besides writing Gaitán had as a hobby being a DJ.

Death
Gaitan died of heart failure in a Bogota hospital in 2019.

References

External links
 

1960 births
2019 deaths
Colombian television producers
Colombian screenwriters
Male screenwriters